Stanisław Potocki hr. Piława (1659 – 12 September 1683 at the Battle of Vienna), was a Polish noble, starost of Halicz and Kołomyja, rotmistrz and pułkownik of cavalry. Son of Hetman Andrzej Potocki and brother of Hetman Józef Potocki. He died at the age of around 24.

He is buried in the Collegiate Church of Stanisławów (now Ivano-Frankivsk) but his heart remained in Vienna and was buried in the Franciscan Church.

Bibliography
  Polski Słownik Biograficzny t. 28 s. 153

References

1659 births
1683 deaths
Andrzej
Starost of Halych